XHVHT-FM is a radio station on 99.1 FM in Villahermosa, Tabasco. It is owned by Radiorama and carries its Oreja FM format.

History
XEVHT-AM 1270 received its concession on September 30, 1992. It has always been owned by Radiorama.

XEVHT migrated to FM in 2010.

References

Radio stations in Tabasco